The  Chief Theater, at 122 E. Main St. in Coldwater, Kansas, was built in 1928.  Also known as the Gossett Theater and as Stark's Comanche Theatre, it was listed on the National Register of Historic Places in 2005. 

It was designed by architect Paul E. Gossett and built by contractor Thomas H. Howard.  It is a two-story two-part commercial block building.

References

Theatres on the National Register of Historic Places in Kansas
Late 19th and Early 20th Century American Movements architecture
Buildings and structures completed in 1928
Comanche County, Kansas
Theatres in Kansas